SC Dornach  is a Swiss football team from Dornach, Switzerland that plays in the 1. Liga Classic Group 2, the fourth division of Swiss football.

External links
Official website

Association football clubs established in 1918
Football clubs in Switzerland
SC Dornach